The following is a list of WBA female world champions certificated by the World Boxing Association (WBA).

Stand: March 31, 2020.

r – Champion relinquished title.
s – Champion stripped of title.

During the 2009 WBA convention in Colombia, Susi Kentikian was named the first ever WBA female Super Champion. It was announced that this belt would be called "Susi Kentikian belt" for all other future Super Champions.

Light minimumweight

Minimumweight

Light flyweight

Flyweight

Super flyweight

Bantamweight

Super bantamweight

Featherweight

Super featherweight

Lightweight

Super lightweight

Welterweight

Super welterweight

Middleweight

Super middleweight

Light heavyweight

See also

 List of current female world boxing champions
 List of female undisputed world boxing champions
 List of WBC female world champions
 List of IBF female world champions
 List of WBO female world champions
 List of WIBO world champions

References

Female
Women's boxing
WBA
WBA